The Provincial League Riders Championship was a contest between the top riders (or two riders) with the highest average points total from eachmspeedway club competing in the Provincial League in the United Kingdom. Held in each year that the league existed - between 1960 and 1964. The competition was superseded by the British League Division Two Riders Championship in 1968. The Provincial League had merged with the National League in 1965, to form the British League.

Winners

See also
 List of United Kingdom Speedway League Riders' champions
 Speedway Provincial League

References

Speedway competitions in the United Kingdom